In organic chemistry, episulfides are a class of organic compounds that contain a saturated, heterocyclic ring consisting of two carbon atoms and one sulfur atom. It is the sulfur analogue of an epoxide or aziridine. They are also known as thiiranes, olefin sulfides, thioalkylene oxides, and thiacyclopropanes. Episulfides are less common and generally less stable than epoxides. The most common derivative is ethylene sulfide.

Structure
The  and  angles are respectively 66.0 and 48.0°.

Preparation

History
A number of chemists in the early 1900s, including Staudinger and Pfenninger (1916), as well as Delepine (1920) studied episulfides.  I 1934 Dachlauer and Jackel devised a general synthesis of episulfides from epoxides using alkali thiocyanates and thiourea.

Contemporary methods
Following the lead of Dachlauer and Jackel, contemporary routes to episulfides utilize a two-step method, converting an olefin to an epoxide followed by thiation using thiocyanate or thiourea.

Episulfides can also be prepared from cyclic carbonates, hydroxy mercaptans, hydroxyalkyl halides, dihaloalkanes, and halo mercaptans.  The reaction of ethylene carbonate and KSCN gives ethylene sulfide:
KSCN + C2H4O2CO -> KOCN + C2H4S + CO2

The metal-catalyzed reaction of sulfur with alkenes has been demonstrated.

Reactions
Common uses of episulfides in both academic and industrial settings most often involve their use as monomers in polymerization reactions.
Episulfides have an innate ring strain due to the nature of three-membered rings.  Therefore, most reactions of episulfides involve ring-opening.  Most commonly, nucleophiles are employed for the ring-opening process.  For terminal episulfide, nucleophiles attack the primary carbon.  Nucleophiles include anionic hydride, thiolates, alkoxide, amines, and carbanions.

Applications
Thiiranes occur very rarely in nature and are of no significance medicinally.

Very few commercial applications exist, although the polymerization of episulfide has been reported.

Dithiiranes
Dithiiranes are three membered rings containing two sulfur atoms and one carbon.  One example was prepared by oxidation of a 1,3-dithietane.

References

Functional groups